Electroviscous effects, in chemistry of colloids and surface chemistry, according to an IUPAC definition, are the effects of the particle surface charge on viscosity of a fluid.

Viscoelectric is an effect by which an electric field near a charged interface influences the structure of the surrounding fluid and affects the viscosity of the fluid.

Kinematic viscosity of a fluid, η,  can be expressed as a function of electric potential gradient (electric field), by an equation in the form:

where f is the viscoelectric coefficient of the fluid.

The value of f for water (ambient temperature) has been estimated to be (0.5–1.0) × 10−15 V−2 m2.

See also
 Constrictivity
 Electrorheological fluid
 Wien effect

References

Surface science